Jefferson Elementary School District is a K-8 school district headquartered in Daly City, San Mateo County, California, USA, serving the communities of Daly City, Colma, Broadmoor and part of Pacifica.

The district was established in 1866 and, has some 350 teachers serving 6,000 students. The district has ten elementary schools and four intermediate/middle schools; high schools in the area are overseen by the Jefferson Union High School District. More than 20 different languages are spoken by students in the school district.

The district is overseen by a five member elected Board of Education and an appointed Superintendent.

History
Before the district's inception, parents in Daly City had to send their children to schools in the San Francisco region. The first school was in the present day Colma area and was a one-room building constructed in 1856. In the following year a new school (named Jefferson School) was constructed on land donated by Peter Dunks. The school district was established in 1866 and named Jefferson School District.

Woodrow Wilson Elementary School was founded in 1917 and rebuilt eighteen years later. General Pershing School, built in 1917, was remodeled in 1960. Colma Primary and Colma Intermediate Schools were established in 1951, followed by Westlake School in 1952 and Benjamin Franklin in the subsequent year. By the end of the decade, three new schools, Olympia (1955), Vista Mar, and Vista Grande (both 1958), had been opened. The 1960s witnessed the establishment of schools named in honor of Christopher Columbus, General John J. Pershing, Thomas Edison, Daniel Webster, the former US Presidents John F. Kennedy, Abraham Lincoln, and Franklin D. Roosevelt, Fernando Rivera and M. Pauline Brown. Ben Franklin Intermediate School was constructed in Broadmoor on land that had been intended for a street.

By 1972, the district had 21 schools under its supervision enrolling a total of 9,373 pupils and with a cumulative faculty of 462 teachers. Vista Grande school was demolished later. Critic Allan Temko wrote in the Architectural Forum that "These schools appear with sudden brilliance: ... carefully suited, thoughtfully planned".

William J. Savage served as superintendent of the district from 1918 to 1931. Prior to this appointment, he was principal of Jefferson School. In 2011, Matteo Rizzo retired from the post of superintendent.

District Superintendents

Intermediate schools
 Benjamin Franklin Intermediate
 Fernando Rivera Middle
 Thomas R. Pollicita Intermediate
 Franklin D. Roosevelt K-8

Elementary schools
 Daniel Webster Elementary
 Garden Village Elementary
 George Washington Elementary
 John F. Kennedy Elementary
 M. Pauline Brown Elementary
 Marjorie H. Tobias Elementary
 Susan B. Anthony Elementary
 Thomas Edison Elementary
 Westlake Elementary
 Woodrow Wilson Elementary

References

Bibliography

External links
 
 

School districts established in 1866
School districts in San Mateo County, California
1866 establishments in California